

Vladimir Bogos (born 1 April 1893, Boldureşti; died 1950) was a physician, journalist and Romanian politician who was part of the Bessarabian Parliament. On 27 March 1918 Vladimir Bogos voted the Union of Bessarabia with Romania.

Biography 
He served as Member of the Moldovan Parliament (1917–1918).

Gallery

Bibliography 
Gheorghe E. Cojocaru, Sfatul Țării: itinerar, Civitas, Chişinău, 1998, 
Mihai Taşcă, Sfatul Țării şi actualele autorităţi locale, "Timpul de dimineaţă", no. 114 (849), 27 June 2008 (page 16)

External links 
 Arhiva pentru Sfatul Tarii
 Deputaţii Sfatului Ţării şi Lavrenti Beria

Notes

1893 births
1950 deaths
People from Nisporeni District
People from Kishinyovsky Uyezd
Moldovan MPs 1917–1918
Romanian people of Moldovan descent
Moldovan journalists
Male journalists
20th-century journalists